Kalavati or Kalawati is a modern pentatonic Hindustani classical raga. Svaras Re (the second tone) and Ma (the fourth tone) are strictly omitted (Varjya/Varjit). Kalavati belongs to the Khamaj Thaat.

Aroha and avaroha 
Ārohana

S G P D n S'

In the Western scale, assuming S == C, this would roughly translate to: C E G A B♭ c

Avarohana

S' n D P G S

Kalavati uses (komal) ni as a Vakra Svara in Aroha.

P D n D S'

Vadi and samavadi 
The Vadi is Pa, while the Samvadi is Sa

Pakad or chalan 
Komal Ni is weak in Aroha and often dropped: G P D n D S' or S G P D S', but in Tanas G P D n S' is also taken.

Komal Ni is also Andolita G P D n~ D P

It's also used as G P D n – S' D G P D S n – D P

Organization and relationships 
Kalavati is derived from a Carnatic raga (see also Yagapriya). According to J.D. Patki the raga was popularized in Maharashtra by Pandit Rao Nagarkar, Roshan Ara Begum and Gangubai Hangal. B.Subba Rao explains the Carnatic Kalavati as omitting Ga and Ni in aroha and Ni in Avaroha, using komal Re. That would make it closer to raga Jansamohini.

Carnatic music 
In Carnatic music, Kalavati is approximated as Valachi or Valaji, and is considered to be S G P D n S/S n D P G S, and a janya of the 28th Melakartha, Harikambhoji.

Bandishes(Compositions) composed in Raag Kalavati

Film songs

Tamil

Behavior 
G is often a starting note of a combination: G G P D n D P G. While returning to Sa a descending meend is taken from Ga to Sa

Other movements:

S, G P, G\S ṇ Ḍ S, S PG P, DP GS, G P D - - D - - n D P, G G P D n~ , n D P, G P, G P D n D, nD S', S' G' S' S' G' P' G' S' n D, G P D, n n D P, G D P, G n D, G'\S' n D, n D P G P DP G\S, ṇ Ḍ S - | G P D n S n D P G\S - ||

Samay (time) 
Midnight

Historical information

Important recordings 
 Imrat Khan, L.P.record No. EASD-1358
 Nishat Khan, "Sentimental Sitar", Super Cassettes Ind (1994). Ltd, as CD: SICCD 042
 Prabha Atre, "Classical Vocal: Maru Bihag, Kalavati, Thumri Mishra Khamaj", HMV
 S Balachander, Veena, "Carnatic Instrumental: Muthuswamy Dikshithar Krithi – Kalavati Kamalasana Yuvati";   http://gaana.com/share/titemI41181
Acharya Dr. Pandit Gokulotsavji Maharaj, Hindustani Classical Vocal, Bharat Jahan Se Pyara भारत जहां से प्यारा. Recorded to DoorDarshan

See also 
 Diksha
 Kalavati tantra
 Tantra

References

External links 
 Film Songs in Rag Kalavati
 Example of Raag Kalavati on Youtube by Ch-02: SANSKRITI [Arts, History, Philosophy]

Literature 
 
 
 
 

Hindustani ragas
Janya ragas